Epilobium montanum or Broad-leaved Willowherb is a species of flowering plant in the willowherb family Onagraceae.

Description
This species grows to 60 cm high. The leaves are hairless and serrate and ovate-lanceolate. They are mostly positioned opposite and have short stalks. The flowers are pale mauve and about 8 mm across with a 4-lobed stigma in terminal racemes.

Distribution
Common throughout Britain and Ireland as well as most of Europe. It is also present in central and eastern Asia and has been introduced in North America, Japan and New Zealand.

Ecology
It is typically found on disturbed ground, base-rich soils, in hedges and as a garden weed.

Medicine
Epilobium montanum herb has been used in the traditional Austrian medicine internally as tea for treatment of disorders of the prostate, kidneys, and urinary tract. A review of studies of the use of extracts from Epolobium species indicated that there was some evidence for traditional uses with digestive disorders. The extracts contained mixtures of flavonoids, phenolic acids and tannins, with the tannin oenothein B possibly a major contributor to biological activity. There was not sufficient evidence of efficacy in prostate disorders.

References

montanum
Flora of Europe
Flora of Lebanon
Plants described in 1753
Taxa named by Carl Linnaeus